This page summarizes projects that brought more than  of new liquid fuel capacity to market with the first production of fuel beginning in 2003.  This is part of the Wikipedia summary of Oil Megaprojects—see that page for further details.  2003 saw 30 projects come on stream with an aggregate capacity of  when full production was reached (which may not have been in 2003).

Quick Links to Other Years

Detailed Project Table for 2003

See also
 2003 world oil market chronology

References

2003
Oil fields
Proposed energy projects
Projects established in 2003
2003 in the environment
2003 in technology